Ibrahima Cissé (born 28 February 1994) is a professional footballer who plays for Russian club Ural Yekaterinburg. Born in Belgium, Cissé represents the Guinea national football team internationally.

Career

Fulham
Fulham tried to sign Cissé from Belgium side Standard Liège in January 2017, but it took until 7 July 2017 that Fulham finally signed him for an undisclosed fee. Cissé was released by mutual consent from Fulham on 1 February 2020.

Ural Yekaterinburg
On 8 September 2022, Cissé signed with Ural Yekaterinburg in Russia.

International career
Cissé was born in Belgium and is of Guinean descent. He was formerly a youth international for Belgium. However, he pledged his international allegiance to Guinea in March 2018.

On 25 April 2018, Cissé accepted an invitation to represent the Guinea national football team. He made his professional debut for Guinea in a 1–0 2019 Africa Cup of Nations qualification win over Central African Republic on 9 September 2018.

Career statistics

Club

International

International goals
Scores and results list Guinea's goal tally first.

References

External links

1994 births
Belgian people of Guinean descent
Citizens of Guinea through descent
Living people
Footballers from Liège
Guinean footballers
Guinea international footballers
Belgian footballers
Belgium youth international footballers
Belgium under-21 international footballers
Association football midfielders
Association football fullbacks
Standard Liège players
K.V. Mechelen players
Fulham F.C. players
R.F.C. Seraing (1922) players
FC Ural Yekaterinburg players
Belgian Pro League players
Challenger Pro League players
Premier League players
English Football League players
Russian Premier League players
Guinean expatriate footballers
Guinean expatriate sportspeople in England
Belgian expatriate footballers
Belgian expatriate sportspeople in England
Expatriate footballers in England
Guinean expatriate sportspeople in Russia
Belgian expatriate sportspeople in Russia
Expatriate footballers in Russia
2019 Africa Cup of Nations players
2021 Africa Cup of Nations players